The Roman Catholic  Diocese of Ciudad Obregón (erected 20 June 1959). It is centered in Ciudad Obregón, Sonora, Mexico.  It is a suffragan diocese of the Archdiocese of Hermosillo. Along with the Archdiocese of Chihuahua and the Diocese of Ciudad Juárez, it yielded territory in 1966 to form the Territorial Prelature of Madera.

Bishops

Ordinaries
José de la Soledad Torres y Castañeda (28 November 1959 – 4 March 1967) 
Miguel González Ibarra (15 July 1967 – 14 November 1981) 
Luis Reynoso Cervantes (15 July 1982 – 17 August 1987), appointed Bishop of Cuernavaca, Morelos  
Vicente García Bernal (30 March 1988 – 8 November 2005)
Juan Manuel Mancilla Sánchez (8 November 2005 – 18 June 2009), appointed Bishop of Texcoco
Felipe Padilla Cardona (1 October 2009 – 15 September 2020)
Rutilo Felipe Pozos Lorenzini (15 September 2020 — present)

Other priest of this diocese who became bishop
Sigifredo Noriega Barceló, appointed Bishop of Ensenada, Baja California in 2007

Episcopal See
Ciudad Obregón, Sonora

References

External links

Ciudad Obregon
Christian organizations established in 1959
Roman Catholic dioceses and prelatures established in the 20th century
Ciudad Obregón, Roman Catholic Diocese of